Between Us is the debut studio album by Australian songwriter and record producer Hayden James. James told Billboard the album represents "the journey through different stages of relationships; love, separation and ultimately hope.". The album was released on 14 June 2019.

James added in a Press release "Everything that I write obviously has my own DNA in it. It's important to me to make sure that when people listen to a record of mine they know it's a Hayden James record without having to look it up, and that comes to production techniques I use or the way I actually write the songs. So this record is more of a development of my sounds than anything else."

At the ARIA Music Awards of 2019, the album was nominated for Best Male Artist.

At the J Awards of 2019, the album was nominated for Australian Album of the Year.

Critical reception

Between Us received widespread acclaim.
 
Carley Hall from the Music gave the album 4 out of 5 saying "With Between Us, James shows he is more than the usual blockbuster anthems we have come to expect." Triple J said "[James] has pulled out all the stops across eleven deep house tracks. From top shelf collaborators to propulsive bass lines and melodic hooks, this is home grown dance at its finest."

Track listing

Charts

Weekly charts

Year-end charts

Release history

References

2019 debut albums
Hayden James albums